Zdzisław Dziadulski (5 December 1896 – 1940) was a Polish equestrian. He competed in two events at the 1924 Summer Olympics. He was killed during World War II.

References

External links
 

1896 births
1940 deaths
Polish male equestrians
Olympic equestrians of Poland
Equestrians at the 1924 Summer Olympics
Sportspeople from Kraków
Polish Austro-Hungarians
Polish military personnel killed in World War II